Lumbardh Dellova (born 1 January 1999) is a Kosovan professional footballer who plays as a centre-back for Kosovan club Ballkani and the Kosovo national team.

Club career

Hajduk Split

Beginnings in the second team
On 1 September 2018, Dellova signed a three-year contract with Croatian Second Football League club Hajduk Split II. On 22 March 2019, he was named as a Hajduk Split II substitute for the first time in a league match against Varaždin. His debut with Hajduk Split II came on 26 April in a 0–1 away win against Hrvatski Dragovoljac after being named in the starting line-up.

Unused substitute in the senior team
On 21 July 2019, Dellova was named as a Hajduk Split substitute for the first time in a league match against Istra 1961 and received squad number 77. In addition to this match, he has fourteen matches as a unused substitute.

Loan at Prishtina
On 8 September 2020, Dellova joined Football Superleague of Kosovo side Prishtina, on a season-long loan. Eleven days later, he made his debut in a 3–0 home win against Drenica after being named in the starting line-up.

Return from loan
On 13 July 2021, Dellova returned to Croatian First Football League side Hajduk Split after agreeing to a four-year contract extension agreement and received squad number 16. Five days later, he made his debut in a 2–2 away draw against Lokomotiva after coming on as a substitute at 81st minute in place of Gergő Lovrencsics.

International career

Under-19
On 1 October 2017, Dellova was named as part of the Kosovo U19 squad for 2018 UEFA European Under-19 Championship qualifications. Two days later, he made his debut with Kosovo U19 in a match against Austria U19 after being named in the starting line-up.

Under-21
On 11 November 2019, Dellova received a call-up from Kosovo U21 for the 2021 UEFA European Under-21 Championship qualification match against Austria U21, and made his debut after coming on as a substitute at 66th minute in place of Leonat Vitija.

Senior
On 31 May 2021, Dellova received a call-up from Kosovo for the friendly matches against Guinea and Gambia, but a day later the Football Federation of Kosovo confirmed that he and his three Prishtina teammates who were called up for these matches will not be part of the national team following the club's request to release them from the squad in order to be as fresh as possible for the 2021–22 UEFA Champions League preliminary round matches. His debut with Kosovo came on 24 March 2022 in a friendly match against Burkina Faso after coming on as a substitute at 72nd minute in place of Mërgim Vojvoda.

Career statistics

Club

International

References

External links

1999 births
Living people
People from Orahovac
Kosovan footballers
Kosovo youth international footballers
Kosovo under-21 international footballers
Kosovo international footballers
Kosovan expatriate footballers
Kosovan expatriate sportspeople in Slovenia
Kosovan expatriate sportspeople in Croatia
Association football central defenders
Football Superleague of Kosovo players
KF Liria players
FC Prishtina players
KF Ballkani players
First Football League (Croatia) players
Croatian Football League players
HNK Hajduk Split players